Condylolomia is a genus of snout moths. It was described by Augustus Radcliffe Grote in 1873.

Species
Condylolomia metapachys Hampson, 1897
Condylolomia participalis Grote, 1873

References

Chrysauginae
Pyralidae genera